Mandya Lok Sabha constituency is one of the 28 Lok Sabha (parliamentary) constituencies in Karnataka state in southern India.

This constituency covers the entire Mandya district ( ಮಂಡ್ಯ ) and part of Mysore district.

Vidhan Sabha segments
Mandya Lok Sabha constituency presently comprises the following eight Legislative Assembly segments:

Members of Lok Sabha

^ by-poll

Election results

Lok Sabha Election 2019

Bye-election, 2018

General Election, 2014

Bye-election, 2013

Lok Sabha Election, 2009

See also
 Mandya district
 List of Constituencies of the Lok Sabha

References

External links
Mandya lok sabha  constituency election 2019 date and schedule

Lok Sabha constituencies in Karnataka
Mandya district